The Yogyakarta and Surakarta Offensive (Indonesian: Serangan Yogyakarta dan Surakarta) were two major offensives during the Indonesian National Revolution. The offensive started with General Offensive of 1 March 1949 and the Siege of Surakarta. Each proved a major boast for the morale of the TNI despite defeats in both actions.

General Offensive of 1 March 1949

In early 1949, Hamengkubuwono IX conceived the idea of a major offensive to be launched against Yogyakarta and the Dutch troops occupying it. The purpose of this offensive was to show to the world that Indonesia still existed and that it was not ready to surrender. The Offensive caught the Dutch by surprise. For his part, Hamengkubuwono IX allowed his palace to be used as a hide out for the troops. For 6 hours, the Indonesian troops had control of Yogyakarta before finally retreating. The offensive was a moral success, inspiring demoralized troops all around Indonesia. The battle contributed to the United Nations call for the release of Indonesian political prisoners under the Dutch and considerably successful in showing the world the Indonesian struggles still exist. In 29 June 1949, the Dutch later withdrew from Yogyakarta after pressure from the United Nations.

Surakarta insurgency

The Indonesian officers and Pakubuwono XII, strategically planned to use the opportunity before the ceasefire announced by Sudirman, to gain position and seize the enemy's position in Surakarta. The attack was directly supported by Pakubuwono XII by hiding several Indonesian troops in his palace. The planned attack was intended to let the Dutch know that Indonesia still had fangs. The Dutch were shocked by this attack, and ended with the failure of the Royal Dutch Army to defend Surakarta, shaking the confidence of the Dutch Parliament in the performance of its troops. This forced the Dutch prime minister to accommodate the demands of the Indonesian delegation as a condition before they were willing to attend the Round Table Conference.

Aftermath
This last battle of the RST showed again the qualitative superiority of the KST/RST on the Indonesian nationalist fighters.
The leader of the raid on Surakarta on August 7, 1949 was Lieutenant Colonel Slamet Riyadi. To commemorate this event, the main street of the city of Surakarta was renamed "Brigadier General Slamet Riyadi Street".

References

Conflicts in 1949
Indonesian National Revolution
1949 in Indonesia